Pitcombe is a village and civil parish  south-west of Bruton and  from Wincanton in Somerset, England. It has a population of 532. The parish includes the hamlets of Cole and Godminster.

The village lies on the River Pitt and other streams that flow into the River Brue.

Godminster Lane Quarry and Railway Cutting is a geological Site of Special Scientific Interest important for study of the Inferior Oolite limestones of Middle Jurassic age. The rocks do contain the rich assemblage of fossil ammonites typical of the north Dorset/south Somerset area. It is also important as a reference site for three sub-divisions (zones) of the Inferior Oolite — the laeviscula, discites and concavum Zones.

History

The name Pitcombe means "the marshy valley".

Evidence of prehistoric activity has been found near Godminster Farm, where a Roman coin hoard was also discovered.

In the Domesday Book of 1086 the manor was held by Turstin FitzRolf and already had two watermills.

Pitcombe was part of the hundred of Bruton.

It was on the Somerset and Dorset Joint Railway, now disused.

Governance

The parish council has responsibility for local issues, including setting an annual precept (local rate) to cover the council's operating costs and producing annual accounts for public scrutiny. The parish council evaluates local planning applications and works with the local police, district council officers, and neighbourhood watch groups on matters of crime, security, and traffic. The parish council's role also includes initiating projects for the maintenance and repair of parish facilities, as well as consulting with the district council on the maintenance, repair, and improvement of highways, drainage, footpaths, public transport, and street cleaning. Conservation matters (including trees and listed buildings) and environmental issues are also the responsibility of the council.

The village falls within the Non-metropolitan district of South Somerset, which was formed on 1 April 1974 under the Local Government Act 1972, having previously been part of Wincanton Rural District. The district council is responsible for local planning and building control, local roads, council housing, environmental health, markets and fairs, refuse collection and recycling, cemeteries and crematoria, leisure services, parks, and tourism.

Somerset County Council is responsible for running the largest and most expensive local services such as education, social services, libraries, main roads, public transport, policing and fire services, trading standards, waste disposal and strategic planning.

It is also part of a county constituency represented in the House of Commons of the Parliament of the United Kingdom. It elects one Member of Parliament (MP) by the first past the post system of election.

Landmarks

Hadspen house and garden is within the parish. The house was built for William Player in the late 17th century, but has undergone several major restorations. It is built of Cary stone ashlar, with a hipped Welsh slate roof behind parapets and stone chimney stacks. It has been designated by English Heritage as a grade II* listed building.

There is still a working quarry within the parish of Pitcombe, notably Hadspen Quarry Ltd located in Higher Hadspen. They provide the stone to the locality which gives this area in South Somerset its local unique characteristics of honey coloured buildings.

Gants Mill is an 18th-century watermill with 13th-century origins. It is a Grade II* listed building and now has a turbine producing hydroelectricity.

Godminster Manor is a 15th-century manor house which underwent extensive restoration following a fire in 1924.

Cole Manor dates from the 17th century.

The dismantled Somerset and Dorset Joint Railway passes through the village over a viaduct. At the north of the village is the old Cole Railway Station.

The village is the home of Bruton School for Girls.

Religious sites

The church, dedicated to St Leonard, has a 15th-century tower at the west end containing six bells. The church was rebuilt, with the exception of its tower, in 1858. It has been designated by English Heritage as a Grade II listed building.

Notable residents
 Herbert John "Bert" Pitman MBE (1877–1961), Third Officer on board the Titanic
 Stephen Henry Hobhouse (1881–1961), pacifist, conscientious objector during World War I, prison reformer, writer and theologian
 Henry Hobhouse (1854–1937) Justice of the Peace and Liberal Member of Parliament in the House of Commons from 1885 until 1906

References

External links

parish council web site

Villages in South Somerset
Civil parishes in Somerset